Richland County School District One (abbreviated RCSD One or "Richland One"), is a school district with its headquarters in the Stevenson Administration Building in Columbia, South Carolina.

RCSD One is South Carolina's fifth-largest school district, and serves a population of more than 22,939 students from urban, suburban and rural communities in Columbia. It is centrally located about 1.5 hours away from the beaches and the mountains of South Carolina.

High schools 
RCSD One operates 7 high schools.

Area 1
Dreher High School Blue Devils
Lower Richland High School Diamond Hornets

Area 2 
A.C. Flora High School Falcons
C.A. Johnson High School Green Hornets
W. J. Keenan High School Raiders

Area 3 
Columbia High School Capitals 
Eau Claire High School Shamrocks

Middle schools 
RCSD One operates 9 middle schools.

Area 1
Hand Middle School
Hopkins Middle School
Southeast Middle School

Area 2
Crayton Middle School cavaliers 
W.A. Perry Middle School
W.G. Sanders Middle School

Area 3
Alcorn Middle School
Gibbes Middle School
St. Andrews Middle School

Elementary schools
RCSD One also operates 29 elementary schools.

Area 1
A.C. Moore Elementary School
Caughman Road Elementary School
Gadsden Elementary School
Hopkins Elementary School
Horrell Hill Elementary School
Meadowfield Elementary School
Mill Creek Elementary School
Rosewood Elementary School
South Kilbourne Elementary School
Webber Elementary School

Area 2
Bradley Elementary School 
Brennen Elementary School 
W. Clark Brockman Elementary School
Burnside Elementary School
Burton-Pack Elementary School
Carver-Lyon Elementary School
Lewis Greenview Elementary School
Pendergrass-Fairwold Elementary School
Satchel Ford Elementary School; Kevin J Hasinger, Principal
Watkins-Nance Elementary School

Area 3
Arden Elementary
E. E. Taylor Elementary
Forest Heights Elementary
H.B. Rhame Elementary
Hyatt Park Elementary
John P. Thomas Elementary
Logan Elementary School
Pine Grove Elementary
W.S. Sandel Elementary

Special Schools and Programs in the District 
 Challenger Learning Center of Richland County School District One
 Heyward Career and Technology Center
 Adult Education
 Evening High School
 Olympia Learning School Alternative
 Pendergrass Fairwold School
 William S. Hall School

Charter schools 
 Richland One Middle College (Grades 11-12)
 Carolina School for Inquiry

See also

 Richland County School District Two

References

External links 
Richland County School District One Official Website

Education in Columbia, South Carolina
Education in Richland County, South Carolina
School districts in South Carolina